József Széll de Duka et Szentgyörgyvölgy (14 October 1880 – 27 August 1956) was a Hungarian politician, who served as Interior Minister between 1937 and 1938. He was the nephew of Kálmán Széll, former Prime Minister of Hungary.

References
 Magyar Életrajzi Lexikon

1880 births
1956 deaths
People from Szombathely
Hungarian Interior Ministers